Jon Agirre Egaña (born 10 September 1997) is a Spanish cyclist, who currently rides for UCI ProTeam .

Major results
2019
 1st  Mountains classification, Tour de l'Avenir
2021
 4th Overall Alpes Isère Tour

References

External links

1997 births
Living people
Spanish male cyclists
Cyclists from the Basque Country (autonomous community)
People from Urola Kosta
Sportspeople from Gipuzkoa